Romaleon is a genus of marine crabs formerly considered in the genus Cancer.

Species
The genus, as currently circumscribed, contains seven species:

References

Cancroidea